The .25-20 Winchester, or WCF (Winchester center fire), was developed around 1895 for the Winchester Model 1892 lever action rifle.  It was based on necking down the .32-20 Winchester. In the early 20th century, it was a popular small game and varmint round, developing around 1,460 ft/s with 86-grain bullets.
But two years earlier Marlin Firearms Co. had already necked down the .32-20 Winchester, and called it the .25-20 Marlin. It was first chambered in Model 1889 lever action Marlins long before Winchester did the same thing and put their name on the .25-20.

While the SAAMI pressure rating is a full 28,000 CUP, modern ammunition is often loaded lighter in deference to the weaker steels used on many of the original guns. The early black powder cartridges were loaded to about 20,000 psi, but the SAAMI rating is close to that of the high velocity smokeless rounds produced later. The high velocity loadings developed 1,732 ft/s.

It was easy and economical to reload and was once a favorite with farmers, ranchers, pot hunters, and trappers. Though the .25-20 has been used on deer and even claimed the James Jordan Buck, a whitetail deer of long standing record in 1914, it is now rarely used on large-bodied game due to its sedate ballistics and light bullet construction, which make humane one-shot kills unlikely.  Though the higher velocity loads would be destructive for small game use, the handloader can run heavier  cast lead bullets such as the 85 gr. LRNFP at more sedate velocities around 1,000-1,200 FPS to anchor game with much more authority than the .22 Long Rifle, yet not destroy meat.  The .25-20 is still a very viable small game, fur bearing and trapping cartridge.

The .25-20 Winchester is sometimes confused with the similarly named .25-20 Single Shot; the two cartridges are markedly different and do not interchange with one another.

See also
 List of rifle cartridges
 Table of handgun and rifle cartridges
 6 mm caliber

References

 Cartridge dimensions from ANSI/SAAMI Z299.4-1992 p. 45

External links
 The Reload Bench
 Chuck Hawks
 Guns&Ammo Magazine ballistics 

Pistol and rifle cartridges
Winchester Repeating Arms Company cartridges